San Pietro ad Oratorium is the name of a Romanesque-style Roman Catholic church, and formerly of an adjacent Benedictine monastery, now ruins, located in a rural mountainside, near the banks of the Tirino river, about 6 km from the town of Capestrano, region of Abruzzo, Italy.

History and description

Chronicles suggest that some church structure might have been present by the 7th century, but the original abbey was commissioned in AD 752 by the Lombard king Desiderius, and made subservient to the monastery of San Vincenzo al Volturno. In 1117, the church was consecrated by Pope Pasqual II, and had acquired more independence and wealth as an abbey. 

The present church building was initially erected in the 12th century; of the monastery buildings little remains but ruins, in part due to abandonment and also because or recurrent floods. This partially reconstructed church has a nave, two side aisles and three semicircular apses. There is only one entrance door with a lintel decorated with floral motif. On the Romanesque portal were added two marble reliefs with the figures of David and St. Vincent Deacon. Some of the addition appear to be spolia from an earlier structure. The façade has a marble square inscription of the Sator Square in Latin. In the 15th century, the abbey was abandoned by the monks. 

The interior is notable for the robust stone arches that separate the naves. The main altar is underneat a domed ciborium. The walls of the central apse has a remarkable 12th-century fresco depicting Christ among the twelve disciples above a register with the Twenty-Four Elders from the Book of Revelation.

References

 

Romanesque architecture in Abruzzo
12th-century churches
Benedictine monasteries in Italy
Churches in the province of L'Aquila